This list of amphibians of South Africa contains species that form a part of the class Amphibia (phylum Chordata) fauna of South Africa. The list follows the South African National Bioinformatics Institute listing.

Where common names are given, they are not the only common names in use for the species.

Anura
Order Anura – frogs and toads

Arthroleptidae 
Family Arthroleptidae
 Genus Arthroleptis:
 Arthroleptis stenodactylus Pfeffer, 1893, savannah squeaking frog, endemic to Africa	
 Arthroleptis wahlbergii Smith, 1849, bush squeaker, syn. Arthroleptis wageri, endemic
 Genus Leptopelis:
 Leptopelis bocagi (Günther, 1865), endemic to Africa
 Leptopelis mossambicus Poynton, 1985, Mozambique tree frog, endemic
 Leptopelis natalensis (Smith, 1849), Natal tree frog, Hylambates (Leptopelis) natalensis, endemic
 Leptopelis xenodactylus Poynton, 1963, long-toed tree frog, Leptopelis natalensis (Smith, 1849), endemic

Brevicipitidae 
Family Brevicipitidae

 Genus Breviceps:
 Breviceps acutirostris Poynton, 1963, strawberry rain frog, endemic
 Breviceps adspersus Peters, 1882, Transvaal short-headed frog, endemic
 Breviceps pentheri Werner, 1899, endemic
 Breviceps bagginsi Minter, 2003, Bilbo's rain frog, endemic
 Breviceps fuscus Hewitt, 1925, black rain frog, endemic
 Breviceps gibbosus (Linnaeus, 1758), Cape rain frog, endemic
 Breviceps macrops Boulenger, 1907, Boulenger's short-headed frog, endemic
 Breviceps montanus Power, 1926, mountain rain frog, endemic
 Breviceps mossambicus Peters, 1854, flat-face frog, endemic
 Breviceps namaquensis Power, 1926, Namaqua rain frog, endemic
 Breviceps rosei Power, 1926, Rose's rain frog, endemic
 Breviceps rosei vansoni FitzSimons, 1946, endemic
 Breviceps sopranus Minter, 2003, whistling rain frog, endemic
 Breviceps sylvestris FitzSimons, 1930, forest rain frog, endemic
 Breviceps sylvestris taeniatus Poynton, 1963, endemic
 Breviceps verrucosus Rapp, 1842, plaintive rain frog, endemic

Bufonidae 
Family Bufonidae
 Genus Amietophrynus:
 Amietophrynus garmani (Meek, 1897), Garman's toad, syn. Bufo garmani Meek, 1897, endemic to Africa
 Amietophrynus gutturalis (Power, 1927), guttural toad, syn. Bufo gutturalis Power, 1927, endemic to Africa	
 Amietophrynus maculatus (Hallowell, 1854), flat-backed toad, syn. Bufo maculatus Hallowell, 1854, endemic to Africa
 Amietophrynus pantherinus (Smith, 1828), western leopard toad, syn. Bufo cruciger Schmidt, 1846, Bufo pantherinus Smith, 1828, endemic
 Amietophrynus pardalis (Hewitt, 1935), eastern leopard toad, syn. Bufo pardalis Hewitt, 1935, Bufo regularis pardalis Hewitt, 1935, endemic
 Amietophrynus poweri (Hewitt, 1935), Kimberley toad, syn. Bufo regularis poweri Hewitt, 1935, Bufo poweri Hewitt, 1935, endemic
 Amietophrynus rangeri (Hewitt, 1935), Kei Road toad, syn. Bufo regularis rangeri Hewitt, 1935, Bufo rangeri Hewitt, 1935, endemic
 Genus Capensibufo:
 Capensibufo rosei (Hewitt, 1926), Cape mountain toad, syn. Bufo rosei, endemic in South Africa	
 Capensibufo tradouwi (Hewitt, 1926), Tradouw's mountain toad, syn. Bufo tradouwi, endemic
 Genus Poyntonophrynus:
 Poyntonophrynus fenoulheti (Hewitt & Methuen, 1912), Transvaal dwarf toad, syn. Bufo fenoulheti Hewitt and Methuen, 1912, endemic to Africa
 Poyntonophrynus vertebralis (Smith, 1848), African dwarf toad, syn. Bufo vertebralis Smith, 1848, endemic
 Genus Schismaderma:
 Schismaderma carens (Smith, 1848), red toad, syn. Bufo carens, Schismaderma lateralis, endemic
 Genus Vandijkophrynus:
 Vandijkophrynus amatolicus (Hewitt, 1925), Amatola toad, syn. Bufo amatolicus Hewitt, 1925 |Bufo angusticeps amatolica Hewitt, 1925, endemic
 Vandijkophrynus angusticeps (Smith, 1848), sand toad, syn. Bufo angusticeps Smith, 1848, endemic
 Vandijkophrynus gariepensis (Smith, 1848), karroo toad, syn. Bufo gariepensis Smith, 1848, endemic in Southern Africa
 Vandijkophrynus gariepensis gariepensis (Smith, 1848), endemic
 Vandijkophrynus gariepensis nubicolus Hewitt, 1927, endemic
 Vandijkophrynus robinsoni (Branch & Braack, 1996), paradise toad, syn. Bufo robinsoni Branch and Braack, 1996, endemic in Southern Africa

Heleophrynidae 
Family Heleophrynidae
 Genus Hadromophryne:
 Hadromophryne natalensis (Hewitt, 1913), Natal ghost frog, syn. Heleophryne sylvestris, Heleophryne natalensis Hewitt, 1913, endemic in Southern Africa
 Genus Heleophryne:
 Heleophryne depressa FritzSimons, 1946, endemic
 Heleophryne hewitti Boycott, 1988, Hewitt's ghost frog, endemic
 Heleophryne orientalis FitzSimons, 1946, eastern ghost frog, syn. Heleophryne purcelli orientalis, endemic
 Heleophryne purcelli Sclater, 1898, Purcell's African ghost frog, syn. Heleophryne purcelli purcelli, endemic
 Heleophryne regis Hewitt, 1910, southern ghost frog, syn. Heleophryne purcelli regis, endemic
 Heleophryne rosei Hewitt, 1925, Rose's ghost frog, endemic

Hemisotidae 
Family Hemisotidae
 Genus Hemisus:
 Hemisus guineensis Cope, 1865, Guinea snout-burrower, syn. Engystoma vermiculatum, Hemisus marmoratum guineensis, endemic
 Hemisus guttatus (Rapp, 1842), spotted burrowing frog, syn. Engystoma guttatus, endemic
 Hemisus marmoratus (Peters, 1854), marbled snout-burrower, endemic

Hyperoliidae 
Family Hyperoliidae
 Genus Afrixalus:
 Afrixalus aureus Pickersgill, 1984, golden spiny reed frog, syn. Afrixalus aureus aureus Pickersgill, 1984, Afrixalus aureus crotalus Pickersgill, 1984, Afrixalus crotalus Pickersgill, 1984, endemic
 Afrixalus delicatus Pickersgill, 1984, delicate spiny reed frog, endemic
 Afrixalus fornasini (Bianconi, 1849), Fornasini's spiny reed frog, syn. Afrixalus fornasinii, endemic
 Afrixalus knysnae (Loveridge, 1954), Knysna spiny reed frog, syn. Hyperolius knysnae, endemic
 Afrixalus spinifrons (Cope, 1862), Natal spiny reed frog, endemic
 Genus Hyperolius:
 Hyperolius acuticeps Ahl, 1931, sharp-nosed reed frog, syn. Hyperolius poweri Loveridge, 1938, endemic
 Hyperolius argus Peters, 1854, yellow spotted reed frog, syn. Rappia argus, endemic
 Hyperolius horstockii (Schlegel, 1837), Horstock's reed frog, syn. Eucnemis horstokii, Hyla horstockii, Rappia horstockii, endemic
 Hyperolius marmoratus Rapp, 1842, painted reed frog, endemic
 Hyperolius nasutus Günther, 1865, long reed frog, endemic
 Hyperolius pickersgilli Raw, 1982, Pickersgill's reed frog, endemic
 Hyperolius poweri Loveridge, 1938, Power's reed frog, endemic
 Hyperolius pusillus (Cope, 1862), water lily reed frog, syn. Crumenifera pusilla, Rappia pusilla, endemic
 Hyperolius semidiscus Hewitt, 1927, yellow-striped reed frog, endemic
 Hyperolius tuberilinguis Smith, 1849, tinker reed frog, syn. Hyperolius tuberilinguis, Rappia tuberilinguis, endemic
 Genus Kassina:
 Kassina maculata (Duméril, 1853), red-legged kassina, syn. Hylambates maculatus, endemic
 Kassina senegalensis (Duméril & Bibron, 1841), Senegal running frog, endemic
 Genus Semnodactylus:
 Semnodactylus wealii (Boulenger, 1882), Weale's running frog, syn. Cassina wealii, endemic

Microhylidae 
Family Microhylidae
 Genus Phrynomantis:
 Phrynomantis annectens Werner, 1910, red-spotted Namibia frog, syn. Phrynomerus annectens, endemic
 Phrynomantis bifasciatus (Smith, 1847), South African snake-necked frog, syn. Phrynomerus bifasciatus, endemic

Phrynobatrachidae 
Family Phrynobatrachidae
 Genus Phrynobatrachus:
 Phrynobatrachus acridoides (Cope, 1867), Zanzibar puddle frog, endemic to Africa	
 Phrynobatrachus mababiensis FitzSimons, 1932, Mababe river frog, syn. Phrynobatrachus vanrooyeni, endemic 
 Phrynobatrachus natalensis (Smith, 1849), Natal puddle frog, syn. Stenorhynchus natalensis Smith, 1849, endemic

Pipidae 
Family Pipidae
 Genus Xenopus:
 Xenopus gilli Rose & Hewitt, 1927, Cape clawed toad, syn. Xenopus laevis gilli, Xenopus gilli Rose and Hewitt, 1927, endemic
 Xenopus laevis (Daudin, 1802), African clawed frog, syn. Bufo laevis, endemic
 Xenopus muelleri (Peters, 1844), Muller's clawed frog, syn. Dactylethra muelleri, endemic

Ptychadenidae 
Family Ptychadenidae
 Genus Hildebrandtia:
 Hildebrandtia ornata (Peters, 1878), ornate frog, endemic
 Genus Ptychadena:
 Ptychadena anchietae (Bocage, 1868), savannah ridged frog, syn. Rana anchietae Bocage, 1868, endemic to Africa
 Ptychadena mascareniensis (Duméril & Bibron, 1841), Mascarene ridged frog, syn. Rana mascareniensis, endemic
 Ptychadena mossambica (Peters, 1854), Mozambique ridged frog, syn. Rana mossambica, endemic
 Ptychadena oxyrhynchus (Smith, 1849), sharp-nosed ridged frog, syn. Rana oxyrhynchus endemic
 Ptychadena porosissima (Steindachner, 1867), three-striped grass frog, syn. Rana porosissima, endemic
 Ptychadena pumilio (Boulenger, 1920), Medine grassland frog, endemic to Africa
 Ptychadena schillukorum (Werner, 1908), Sudan ridged frog, endemic to Africa
 Ptychadena taenioscelis Laurent, 1954, small ridged frog, endemic to Africa	
 Ptychadena uzungwensis (Loveridge, 1932), Uzungwe grassland frog, syn. Rana mascareniensis uzungwensis, endemic

Pyxicephalidae 
Family Pyxicephalidae
Genus Amietia:
 Amietia angolensis (Bocage, 1866), Angola river frog, syn. Afrana angolensis (Bocage, 1866), syn. Rana angolensis Bocage 1866, endemic to Africa	
 Amietia dracomontana (Channing, 1978), Drakensberg river frog, syn. Afrana dracomontana (Channing, 1978), Rana dracomontana Channing 1978, endemic
 Amietia fuscigula (Duméril & Bibron, 1841), Cape river frog, syn. Strongylopus hymenopus (Boulenger, 1920), Afrana fuscigula (Duméril and Bibron, 1841), endemic
 Amietia vandijki (Visser & Channing, 1997), Van Dijk's river frog, syn. Afrana vandijki Visser and Channing, 1997, endemic
 Amietia vertebralis (Hewitt, 1927), large-mouthed frog, syn. Rana vertebralis, Amietia umbraculata
Genus Anhydrophryne:
 Anhydrophryne hewitti (FitzSimons, 1947), Natal chirping frog, syn. Arthroleptella hewitti FitzSimons, 1947, endemic
 Anhydrophryne rattrayi Hewitt, 1919, Hogsback frog, endemic
Genus Arthroleptella:
 Arthroleptella bicolor Hewitt, 1926, Bainskloof moss frog, endemic
 Arthroleptella ngongoniensis Bishop and Passmore, 1993, mistbelt chirping frog, syn. Arthroleptella ngongoniensis Bishop and Passmore, 1993, endemic
 Arthroleptella drewesii Channing, Hendricks & Dawood, 1994, Drewes' moss frog, endemic
 Arthroleptella landdrosia Dawood & Channing, 2000, Landdros moss frog, endemic
 Arthroleptella lightfooti (Boulenger, 1910), tiny chirping frog, endemic
 Arthroleptella rugosa Turner & Channing, 2008, introduced	
 Arthroleptella subvoce Turner, de Villiers, Dawood & Channing, 2004				
 Arthroleptella villiersi Hewitt, 1935, De Villiers' moss frog, endemic
Genus Cacosternum:
 Cacosternum boettgeri (Boulenger, 1882), Boettger's dainty frog, syn. Arthroleptis boettgeri
 Cacosternum capense Hewitt, 1925, cross-marked frog, endemic
 Cacosternum karooicum Boycott, de Villiers & Scott, 2002, Karoo Caco, endemic
 Cacosternum namaquense Werner, 1910, Namaqua dainty frog, endemic
 Cacosternum nanum Boulenger, 1887, dwarf dainty frog, endemic
 Cacosternum nanum Polynton 1963, small dainty frog, endemic
 Cacosternum platys Rose, 1950, smooth dainty frog, endemic
 Cacosternum poyntoni Lambiris, 1988, Poynton's caco, endemic
 Cacosternum striatum FitzSimons, 1947, striped metal frog, endemic
Genus Microbatrachella:
 Microbatrachella capensis (Boulenger, 1910), micro frog, syn. Phrynobatrachus capensis, Microbatrachus capensis, endemic
Genus Natalobatrachus:
 Natalobatrachus bonebergi Hewitt & Methuen, 1912, Natal diving frog, syn. Phrynobatrachus bonebergi, endemic 
Genus Poyntonia:
 Poyntonia paludicola Channing & Boycott, 1989, montane marsh frog, endemic
Genus Pyxicephalus:
 Pyxicephalus adspersus Tschudi, 1838, South African burrowing frog, near endemic
 Pyxicephalus edulis Peters, 1854, edible bullfrog, syn. Rana maltzanii, endemic
Genus Strongylopus:
 Strongylopus bonaespei (Dubois, 1981), banded stream frog, endemic
 Strongylopus fasciatus (Smith, 1849), striped stream frog, syn. Rana fasciata, endemic
 Strongylopus grayii (Smith, 1849), Gray's stream frog, endemic
 Strongylopus springbokensis Channing, 1986, Namaqua stream frog, endemic
 Strongylopus wageri (Wager, 1961), Wager's stream frog, syn. Rana wageri, endemic

Ranidae 
Family Ranidae
 Genus Tomopterna:
 Tomopterna cryptotis (Boulenger, 1907), cryptic sand frog, syn. Rana cryptotis
 Tomopterna delalandii (Tschudi, 1838), African bullfrog, endemic
 Tomopterna krugerensis Passmore & Carruthers, 1975, knocking sand frog
 Tomopterna marmorata (Peters, 1854), marbled sand frog
 Tomopterna natalensis (Smith, 1849), Natal sand frog, near endemic
 Tomopterna tandyi Channing & Bogart, 1996, Tandy's sand frog, endemic

Rhacophoridae 
Family Rhacophoridae
 Genus Chiromantis:
 Chiromantis xerampelina Peters, 1854, grey tree frog, near endemic

Notes

References

South African animal biodiversity lists
South Africa
South Africa